The Cupa Ligii 2000 was the second season of the Romanian football League Cup, the Cupa Ligii. The final took place at Cotroceni Stadium in Bucharest.

Semi-finals

Final

Notes

2000
Cupa